Liotipoma lifouensis is a species of small sea snail with calcareous opercula, a marine gastropod mollusc in the family Colloniidae.

Description
The shell grows to a height of 4.3 mm.

Distribution
This marine species occurs off the Loyalty Islands.

References

External links
 To World Register of Marine Species
 

Colloniidae
Gastropods described in 2012